Maxfield may refer to:

 Maxfield (name)
 Maxfield Township, Bremer County, Iowa
 Maxfield, Maine
 Maxfield (horse)